Antón de Alaminos (c. 1482 - ?) was a Spanish navigator and explorer in the New World. He was considered the most experienced and knowledgeable marine pilot serving in the Spanish Main during the first quarter of the sixteenth century. 

Antón de Alaminos was born in Palos de la Frontera around 1482 and joined Christopher Columbus on his fourth voyage to the Americas in 1502.

He was the first naval officer of the Spanish fleet that discovered the peninsula of Yucatan in 1517. He served under the commands of Grijalba and Hernan Cortes, and was the first to pass the Bahama channel.

Notes

References
 
 

 

  

Created via preloaddraft
16th-century explorers